The Atomic Energy Authority Act 1954 is an Act of the Parliament of the United Kingdom which established the United Kingdom Atomic Energy Authority with powers to produce, use and dispose of atomic energy and to carry out research into this and related matters.

Background 
From 1948, the regulation of atomic energy was principally governed by two Acts of Parliament: the Atomic Energy Act 1946 and the Radioactive Substances Act 1948. The 1946 Act had transferred the responsibility for work on atomic energy from the Department of Scientific and Industrial Research to the Ministry of Supply. In December 1953, Parliament agreed to the transfer of Ministerial responsibility for atomic energy from the Minister of Supply to the Lord President of the Council. This was expedient as the Lord President was a senior member of the Cabinet who had no departmental interest in the use of atomic energy.

The Atomic Energy Authority Act 1954 further developed Government oversight, it transferred powers relating to research, development and disposal of radioactive substances from the Lord President to the new United Kingdom Atomic Energy Authority established under the Act. Under this arrangement the duties of the Minister and the Authority were clearly defined. Policy remained the responsibility of the Government while the Authority was given the freedom to operate that policy strategically and efficiently.

Atomic Energy Authority Act 1954 
The Atomic Energy Authority Act 1954 (1954 c. 32) received Royal Assent on 4 June 1954. Its long title is: ‘An Act to provide for the setting up of an Atomic Energy Authority for the United Kingdom, to make provision as to their powers, duties, rights and liabilities, to amend, consequentially on the establishment of and otherwise in connection with that Authority, the Atomic Energy Act, 1946, the Radioactive Substances Act, 1948, and certain other enactments, and for purposes connected with the matters aforesaid.’

Provisions 
The Act comprises 10 Sections and 3 Schedules.

 Section 1. The United Kingdom Atomic Energy Authority. Established the UKAEA, its chairman and members, remuneration.
 Section 2. Functions of the Authority. To produce, use and dispose of atomic energy and carry out research; to manufacture or otherwise produce any radioactive substances.
 Section 3. Power and duties of the Lord President of the Council in relation to the Authority. To promote and control the development of atomic energy; the power to give the Authority directions. 
 Section 4. Financial provisions as to the Authority. The Lord President to pay the Authority monies provided by Parliament.
 Section 5. Powers as to purchase of land, carrying out works, etc. The Lord President may authorise the Authority to purchase compulsorily any land.
 Section 6. Miscellaneous provisions as to the Authority. Land to be deemed Crown property; application of Official Secrets Act 1911 to properties.
 Section 7. Machinery for settling terms and conditions of employment of staff, etc. Terms and conditions of employment; safety, health and welfare of persons 
 Section 8. Interpretation. Interpretation of the Atomic Energy Act, 1946, and the Radioactive Substances Act, 1948.
 Section 9. Application to Northern Ireland. The Act applied to Northern Ireland.
 Section 10. Short title and citation. The Act may be cited as the Atomic Energy Authority Act, 1954

Schedules

 First schedule. Provisions as to the United Kingdom Atomic Energy Authority. Comprising 9 paragraphs.
 Second schedule. Transfer of property rights and liabilities from the Lord President of the Council to the Authority. Comprising 4 paragraphs.
 Third schedule. Adaptations and Modifications of Enactments. The Atomic Energy Act 1946, the Radioactive Substances Act 1948, and the Official Secrets Act 1911, plus others

Aftermath 
The United Kingdom Atomic Energy Authority (UKAEA) was established on 19 July 1954 with the power "to produce, use and dispose of atomic energy and carry out research into any matters therewith".

The UKAEA developed a civil nuclear reactor programme including two nuclear power stations in 1957 (Berkeley and Bradwell), a further two in 1959 and eight more in the early 1960s.

The Atomic Energy Authority Act 1954 was amended by the Atomic Energy Authority Act 1959 c. 5; by the Atomic Energy Authority Act 1986 c. 3; and by the Atomic Energy (Miscellaneous Provisions) Act 1981 c. 48.

See also 

 Atomic Energy Authority Act
 United Kingdom Atomic Energy Authority
 Nuclear power in the United Kingdom
 Atomic Energy Research Establishment

References 

United Kingdom Acts of Parliament 1954